Spišská Nová Ves is a town in the Košice Region of Slovakia. The town is located southeast of the High Tatras in the Spiš region, and lies on both banks of the Hornád River. It is the biggest town of the Spišská Nová Ves District.

Tourist attractions nearby include the medieval town of Levoča, Spiš Castle and the Slovak Paradise National Park. A biennial music festival, Divertimento musicale, is held here, attracting amateur music ensembles from all over Slovakia.

Names and etymology
The town originated by merging an older Slavic settlement Iglov and a more recent settlement of German colonists (- literally New Village).

Iglov is probably derived from a Slavic word igla (Proto-Slavic igъla, jьgъla, modern Slovak ihla) - a needle. Šimon Ondruš explains the name from Slavic jug - the south, a light, Juglava/Iglava/Iglov - a light place, a glade. The name was adopted by the Hungarians as Igló.

History

Settlement in the town's region dates to the Neolithic age. There is evidence of a prosperous society that was familiar with copper mining and processing. When the Celts arrived they brought with them advanced iron technology.  Celtic coins have been found in the region. During the 6th century, the period known as the Great Migration, Slavic tribes appeared in the Spiš region. During the 10th century the structure of their settlements stabilized and important communication roads were established. It became part of the Principality then Kingdom of Hungary.  In the 13th centurty Saxon (Carpathian German) miners founded a town next to an earlier Slavic settlement. The settlement suffered greatly from the invading Tatars in the 13th century. After the Tatar invasion King Béla IV invited German colonists from the town of Jihlava and settled them here. They named the new town Iglau after their place of origin, and it first appeared in written sources as "Villa Nova" or "Neudorf", covering the area of the present town.  

The town received market rights in the 14th century and grew to become an important market town. It became an official mining town in 1380 and had the largest street market in the Kingdom of Hungary. Copper mining was an important activity. The metal was processed in furnaces, which were fuelled with wood from the surrounding forests. A Gothic bell foundry was established by Konrád Gaal who made a large hanging bell for Louis I of Hungary, and was consequently knighted in 1357. The bells made by Konrád Gaal are still hanging and form an important conlegacy of European Gothic metal foundry.

In 1412 Spišská Nová Ves, along with several other Spiš towns, was pawned as loan security by the Hungarian king Sigmund to the Polish king Vladislaus II Jagiełło. This pledge lasted for 360 years.

Blacksmiths were the first local craftsmen to unite into a guild, which was given royal privileges in 1436. They smelted their own ore, or built water-driven forges along the rivers Hornád and Dubnica. Coppersmiths made kettles of a specifically defined weight because kettles were widely used as a means of payment. There were charcoal burners and even resin pickers who collected resin from trees to produce tar for greasing wagons. There were wheelwrights, coopers, weavers, joiners, gunsmiths, basketmakers, bakers, furriers, tanners, cooks and millers, hunters, fishermen and beekeepers.

There were many Germans living in Spiš and through their influence the town became Lutheran in the 1540s. Between 1569 and 1674 Catholic services were forbidden in the pawned towns.  There were many contacts with Poland and this helped to stimulate the national consciousness of the Slovak people. The pawned towns were returned to the Kingdom of Hungary in 1772. In 1778 Spišská Nová Ves became the capital of the "Province of 16 Spiš towns".

In the 19th century the manufacture of stoneware was important in the town. The products all bore a trademark formed from the word "Iglo" with two crossed miners' hammers. Other industrial activities included oil production and a weaving plant as well as agricultural machines.  The railway provided an important means of communication from 1870. A power station was built in 1894 and living conditions improved. In July 1929 the Podtatranská výstava (Sub-Tatras Exhibition) showed results of economic growth and made the town famous in Slovakia. During World War II, Spišská Nova Ves was taken by Soviet troops of the 18th Army on 27 January 1945.

Spišská Nová Ves today

Spišská Nová Ves is a tourist destination today, both because of the town itself and because of the natural environment of the nearby Slovak Paradise mountains. The core of the town is a lens-shaped square (a square with bulging sides), typical of medieval towns). It is a cultural, administrative and business centre of the Spiš region, and is rich in art and historical monuments.

Foremost is the three-naved Gothic church of the Assumption of the Virgin Mary standing in the centre of the town. Its construction dates back to the 14th century and its architecture has been partly preserved. The bas-relief of the Virgin Mary's Coronation on the Gothic tympanum on the south portal of the church is considered to be amongst the most beautiful in the Spiš region. It contains carvings by Master Paul of Levoča. The side pillars are topped by Gothic pinnacles terminating in crossed rosettes. A rosette with tracery crowns the entrance of the church.  The tower is 87m high, the tallest church tower in Slovakia. The neogothic top of the tower dates from 1893 and was executed by the architect Imrich Steindl. The neogothic altar dates from the end of the 19th century. The church contains several liturgical treasures : a cross-shaped silver (and partly gilded) reliquary by the Sienese court jeweller Nicolas Gallicus (first half of the 14th century - but the initials NC may also refer to a possible contributor Nicolaus Castellanus), a silver (partly gilded) crucifix and monstrance attributed to Antonio from Košice (early 16th century), a chalice by Jan Kolbenhayer (1795) and a rare bronze baptismal font (second half 13th century). The Calvary Group (1520) is another masterpiece from the workshop of the Master Paul of Levoča. The church vaulted ceiling contains early renaissance paintings with the Evangelists and four angels playing on musical instruments.

The Evangelical church, standing next to the town hall, was built in Classicist style between 1790 and 1796. It has a cross-shaped ground plan. Inside is an altar piece of Christ on the Mount of Olives, painted by Danish painter Stunder. The water well is decorated with an alabaster relief of Christ with the Good Samaritan.

Another valuable architectural monument is the Province House, now housing the Spiš museum. It has a baroque façade, but the basement dates from the 13th century.  This house was the town hall from the Middle Ages until 1777. The peace treaty between John Jiskra of Brandýs and the Hungarian king Vladislav was signed here in 1443.  Its façade includes the underpass "Levoca gate" with in the middle of its arch the crest of the Province of XVI Spiš  towns. The upper part of the façade is decorated with rococo stucco motives (rocaille) representing in Latin the moral qualities required of a town official : (from left to right) PONDERE SOLO (According to importance only), UTQUIS MERETUR (as one deserves), SUUM CUIQUE (give everyone his due), DIE NOCTUQUE (day and night), IN SOMNIS CUSTOS (guardian during sleep), HINC OCULOS NUSQUAM (not turning his eyes away).

The Town Hall was built between 1777-1779 in the Classical style, and was reconstructed in the mid-1990s. The main façade faces south while the main entrance is on the north side. The south façade has three big arched windows situated between four semi-columns under a massive tympanum. Within the tympanum is the city's coat-of-arms between two griffins.The two inner columns have Ionic capitals.  The council chamber occupies two floors and is lavishly decorated with pilasters and sgraffito with motifs of drapery alternating with the city coat-of-arms.

The theatre building "Reduta" was built in art-nouveau style between 1899 and 1902 by the Budapest architect Koloman  Gerster. He divided its northern and southern part by a risalith (a projection jutting out of the façade). He accentuated the corners of the building by four turrets. He prolongated the western part into a semicircular vestibule. The stage wall is decorated with murals by the Slovak - local artist Jozef Hanula. Today the building  combines a theatre, a richly decorated concert hall and a restaurant.

Demographics  
According to the 2001 census, the town had 39,193 inhabitants. 94.21% of inhabitants were Slovaks, 1.93% Roma and 0.51% Czechs. The religious makeup was 69.81% Roman Catholics, 16.95% people with no religious affiliation, 3.17% Lutherans and 3.05% Greek Catholics.

Notable people
 

Matúš Leskovjanský (born 1987), Slovak professional ice hockey player

Transportation
Spišská Nová Ves railway station is a junction between the Košice–Žilina railway, which is part of Slovakia's main east-west rail corridor, and a  spur line to Levoča. Regular passenger services on the spur line have been suspended since 2003. Public transport is provided by the eurobus, a.s. company and consists of 15 bus lines. Tickets can be bought from the driver and the fare is 0,60€ or 0,30€ reduced fare.

Twin towns – sister cities

Spišská Nová Ves is twinned with:

 L'Aigle, France
 Alsfeld, Germany
 Clausthal-Zellerfeld, Germany
 Grójec, Poland
 Havlíčkův Brod, Czech Republic
 Joinville, Brazil
 Kisújszállás, Hungary
 Myślenice, Poland
 Nitra, Slovakia
 Preveza, Greece
 Tiachiv, Ukraine
 Tongzhou (Beijing), China
 Youngstown, United States

References

Spišská Nová Ves: 1268-1998: 730 rokov prvej písomnej správy;

External links 

 
Spišská Nová Ves District
Cities and towns in Slovakia
Spiš